The Sanremo Challenger, previously known as Sanremo Tennis Cup is a professional tennis tournament played on outdoor red clay courts. It is currently part of the Association of Tennis Professionals (ATP) Challenger Tour. It is held annually at the Circolo Tennis Sanremo in Sanremo, Italy, since 2002. After a hiatus of 10 years, it came back in 2022 with a new edition.

Daniele Bracciali has won most titles, 3 times, in doubles.

Past finals

Singles

Doubles

References

External links
Official website
ITF search

 
ATP Challenger Tour
Clay court tennis tournaments
Tennis tournaments in Italy
Recurring sporting events established in 2002